Nina Bichuya (born 24 August 1937) is a Ukrainian writer who has published several novels and children's works.

Bichuya studied journalism at Lviv University and has worked as a director at the Lviv Theatre for Young People (Перший український театр для дітей та юнацтва). The Ukrainian writer Valeriy Shevchuk commented that in the 1960s she was the queen of Ukrainian women's fiction while today she is considered a pioneer of the urban literature of the 1980s. One of her recent successes is Velyki korolivski lovy (The Great Royal Hunt, 2011) in which she creates psychological depth and tension in her characteristically refined style. From 1989 to 1997 she was the editor of the Prosvita newspaper.

Selected works

Novels
Дрогобицький звіздар (Drogobytsky Astrologer)
Повісті (The Story)
Квітень у човні (April in the Boat)
Родовід (Genealogy) 
Бенефіс (Benefit)
Десять слів поета (The Poet's Ten Words)

Children's works
Канікули у Світлогорську (Holidays in Svetlogorsk)
Звичайний шкільний тиждень (Normal School Week)
Яблуні і зернятко (Apple Trees and Seeds)

References

1937 births
Living people
20th-century Ukrainian women writers
20th-century novelists
21st-century Ukrainian women writers
Ukrainian women novelists
Soviet emigrants to Germany
Writers from Kyiv